Roche Faurio (3,730m) is a mountain of the Massif des Écrins in the Dauphiné Alps in Isère, France. It lies in front of the mighty north face of the Barre des Écrins and towers over the Glacier Blanc. The mountain lies inside the Écrins National Park. It is a popular summit with hikers, taking about four hours to climb from the Écrins Hut, and ski mountaineers.

References

Mountains of Isère
Mountains of Hautes-Alpes
Mountains of the Alps
Alpine three-thousanders